Makisig Morales appeared on the TV reality-show Little Big Star and is the delivery man of the boy band Mak and the Dudes. As a child actor, he played the lead role in the International Emmy-nominated fantaserye, Super Inggo.

At the age of 5 Makisig Morales competed in the Duet Bulilit, a singing segment in MTB, noon-time variety show of ABS-CBN, together with his sister Mayumi. Morales later auditioned with his sister Mayumi and brother Vincent in Little Big Star - a TV singing contest of ABS-CBN, where only Makisig and Mayumi were accepted to compete with other contestants. In 2007 he was announced as the co-host for the next series of Little Big Star. He is the older brother of the child actor Maliksi Morales.

Filmography

Television

Movies

Discography

Awards

References

Filipino male child actors
Filipino male television actors
Filipino child singers
21st-century Filipino male singers
Living people
People from San Mateo, Rizal
Male actors from Rizal
Singers from Rizal
Participants in Philippine reality television series
Star Magic
21st-century Filipino male actors
ABS-CBN personalities
Year of birth missing (living people)